The Ely Imps is a Choir for 7–13 year olds based in Ely Cathedral, their conductor is Paul Trepte

History

2006: John Rutter concert
The Ely Imps was started in 2006 as a choir for a concert with John Rutter conducting and composing music for them. Children from all around the District came to perform, some even coming from as far as Peterborough. The average number of kids there was 108.

2007: Upcoming success
After a sold-out concert, The choir was kept going, as Director of music Paul Trepte became conductor. In 2007 the Imps did Three Concerts at Christmas, two with the Cathedral Choristers and one on their own. All Three Concerts sold out. This saw a rise in Children joining.

2008–present: A success
In May 2008 the Imps sang songs by Richard Rodney Bennett. Then in June went to the Cambridgeshire music concert with 2000 other kids. 
In December another jam-packed Christmas Period led to a concert with the Mediæval Bæbes in 2009. December 2009 saw them do 4 concerts for Christmas. In April 2010 they will do another concert with the Mediæval Bæbes and the May Day concert which attracts around 2000 people every year.

Staff
Conductors:
John Rutter 2006
Paul Trepte 2007–present
Organists:
Alex ??? 2006-2007
Johnathan Lilley 2008–present.
Admin:
Anne Mizen 2006–present

Concerts

2006
John Rutter concert

2007
Christmas Concert
Crib Service
Carol Concert

2008
May Day Concert
Wood Green Animal Shelter Charity Concert
Christmas Concerts (2)
Crib Service
Cambridgeshire Music

2009
Medieval Babes
May Day
Christmas Concerts (3)
Crib Service

2010
Mediæval Bæbes
May Day (TBC)

English choirs
Musical groups established in 2006
Choirs of children